Licking is the action of passing the tongue over a surface.

It may also refer to:

 the action of physically striking an object hard

Places 

 Licking, Missouri
 Licking County, Ohio
 Licking Creek (disambiguation)
 Licking River (disambiguation)
 Licking Township (disambiguation)

See also
 Lick (disambiguation)